Eupithecia subvulgata is a moth in the family Geometridae. It is found in Iran and Russia.

References

Moths described in 1982
subvulgata
Moths of the Middle East
Moths of Asia